Nicholas Channel (also Saint Nicholas Channel) is a strait off the northeastern coast of Cuba. It separates Cuba from the most southwestern of the islands of the Bahamas.

Geography 
Part of the Atlantic Ocean, it is bordered to the west by the Straits of Florida, to the north by the Cay Sal Bank and to the south by the Sabana-Camaguey Archipelago off Cuba's north shore and to the east by the Old Bahama Channel.
Geography of this location can be described as follows:Both the Little and the Great Bahama Banks have their edges towards the Atlantic. These gulfs and channels are full of islands and rocks which with some others farther south are comprehended under the general name of the Bahama Islands. The Key Sal Bank which turns the gulf stream to the north and sends it to the Straits of Florida lies between the Great Bahama Bank and Cuba between 23 and 24 N lat and is divided from the former by the Santarem Channel and from the latter by Nicholas Channel which unite farther to the south east and take the name of Old Bahama Channel. Key Sal Bank is of no great extent and contains few rocks and islets.

References

Straits of the Caribbean
International straits
Bodies of water of Cuba
Bodies of water of the Bahamas
Bahamas–Cuba border
Geography of Camagüey Province
Geography of Ciego de Ávila Province
Geography of Holguín Province
Geography of Las Tunas Province
Geography of Sancti Spíritus Province
Geography of Villa Clara Province